USS Asterion has been the name of two ship of the United States Navy.

 , was a cargo ship that served during both World Wars.
 , was originally named Arcadia Victory and was acquired by the Navy in 1961 as a store ship.

Sources

United States Navy ship names